Eigergletscher is a railway station in the municipality of Lauterbrunnen in the canton of Bern. The station is served by trains of the Jungfrau railway, which run to the Jungfraujoch from Kleine Scheidegg, where they connect with services from Interlaken, Lauterbrunnen, Wengen and Grindelwald via the Bernese Oberland railway and the Wengernalp railway.

The station takes its name from the adjacent Eiger Glacier, and is the Jungfraubahn's last station in the open air, before the line enters its tunnel to the summit. It is also the location of the railway's workshop.

History
The station opened on 19 September 1898, with the opening of the first open air stretch of the Jungfraubahn. After further construction, the line was extended to a temporary terminus within the tunnel at Rotstock station on 2 August 1899.

Jungfraubahn AG announced that a new V-cableway would be constructed to bring visitors direct to Eigergletscher from Grindelwald, shortening journey times to the Jungfraujoch by 47 minutes. Construction started in the summer of 2018 and the new service called the Eiger Express began in December 2020. It allows a connection from a new station, Grindelwald Terminal, to the new Eigergletscher gondola station, with a transfer hall where passengers can transfer from the gondola to the Jungfraubahn train to the Jungfraujoch summit.

Services
The following passenger trains operate:

Gallery

See also
List of highest railway stations in Switzerland

References

External links 
 
 

Railway stations in the canton of Bern
Railway stations in Switzerland opened in 1898